Badagry Heritage Museum is a museum in Badagry, Nigeria that is housed in the District Officer's Office built in 1863 by the British colonial government.

Gallery

References

Museums in Nigeria
Lagos State